Newsround (stylised as newsround, and originally called John Craven's Newsround before his departure in 1989) is a BBC children's news programme, which has run continuously since 4 April 1972. It was one of the world's first television news magazines aimed specifically at children. Initially commissioned as a short series by BBC Children's Department, who held editorial control, its facilities were provided by BBC News. The programme is aimed at 5 to 17-year-olds.

History 
Originally known as John Craven's Newsround, it was first presented by John Craven between 4 April 1972 and 22 June 1989. Originally, stand-in presenters, such as Richard Whitmore, came from the main BBC News bulletins.

In 1987, the show was renamed Newsround, and was presented by a rotating team including with Craven in the dual role of chief presenter and programme editor. The programme gradually developed its own small reporting team, including Helen Rollason, Lucy Mathen, and long-serving space editor Reg Turnill. Other presenters included Juliet Morris, Krishnan Guru-Murthy, Julie Etchingham, Chris Rogers, Kate Gerbeau, Matthew Price and Becky Jago. Regular reporters on the programme, who have also presented it, included Paul Welsh, Lizo Mzimba and Terry Baddoo. Also, for most of its first two decades, Newsround drew upon the BBC's network of national and international correspondents such as John Humphrys, Michael Buerk and Martin Bell.

Newsround was the first British television programme to break the news of the loss of the Space Shuttle Challenger on 28 January 1986. This edition was presented by Roger Finn, who had only recently joined the programme. The programme was also first in Britain to report an assassination attempt on Pope John Paul II in Vatican City in 1981 and provided the first reports from the Windsor Castle fire of November 1992.

In February 2002, Newsround expanded from a sole ten-minute programme on weeknights to through-the-day bulletins seven days a week to tie-in with the launch of the CBBC Channel, and was broadcast across BBC1, BBC2 and the CBBC Channel. With this included a new theme, titles and expanded presenting team. The online and schools' offering were also expanded. In the early 00s Newsround was the most watched programme for children in the UK, and also had the highest AI score (a measure of programme engagement and appreciation) of all CBBC programmes. Following the 9/11 attacks, Newsround launched a guide to help children who were worried by news events. As part of the relocation of the BBC Children's Department, Newsround began broadcasting from new studios at Dock10, MediaCityUK in Salford Quays on Monday 21 November 2011

In July 2020, the 16:00 programme was axed by the BBC after being on air since 1972, as well as the 8:15am broadcast, they concluded that children no longer turn on traditional television channels when they return home from school and would focus on the morning edition instead which will be aimed at schools, where it is often used by teachers in classrooms, in addition to investing in the programme's website. Also, the 7:40am bulletin was moved to 7:45am.

Broadcast times 
Every day, Newsround is broadcast on CBBC once a day, with an eight-minute bulletin at around 7:45am. On Saturday morning, it is also broadcast on BBC Two. Like many BBC News TV bulletins, it is available for 24 hours on BBC iPlayer and the Newsround section of the CBBC website.

Presenters and reporters 
 De'Graft Mensah (2019–present)
Shanequa Paris (2020–present)
Ricky Boleto (2008–present)
Hayley Hassall (2009–present)
Jenny Lawrence (2013–present)
Nina Blissett (2021–present)

Occasional stand-in presenters:
 Nazia Mogra (2015–2020)
Alex Humphreys (2018–present)

Former presenters

Editors 

 Edward Barnes (1972)
 Jill Roach (1976)
 John Craven (1986–1989)
 Eric Rowan
 Nick Heathcote (1990–1996)
 Susie Staples (1996–1998)
 Ian Prince (editor twice).
 Roy Milani
 Sinead Rocks
 Owenna Griffiths (2009–)
 Daniel Clark (−2013)
 Lewis James (2013–present)
 Paul Plunkett (2019; parental leave cover for Lewis James)

Spin-offs

Newsround Specials
A variation on the regular format of Newsround is a series of short (typically 15-minute) documentary films, previously broadcast under the title Newsround Extra but now called "specials", which have been a regular feature since the late 1970s. Two or three series of these documentaries air during the year, which replace the regular bulletins on one day of the week (for Extras it was usually Monday, although sometimes on Fridays, particularly during the 1980s).

Newsround Specials in recent years have included:
 The Wrong Trainers: a series of six animated films dealing with child poverty. The programme won the 2006 Royal award for best children's programme and the 2007 BAFTA children's award for best factual programme.
 The Worst Thing Ever: a dramatised documentary revolving around a child's experience of their parents' divorce.
 Newsround on Knives: an animated look at knife crime from a child's point of view. (Bafta nominated)
 Gone: interviews with four bereaved children. (Bafta nominated)
 Whose Side Are You On?: a drama on the role of bystanders in tackling bullying, featuring Joe Calzaghe, Aston Merrygold, Patsy Palmer, George Sampson and Gemma Hunt (first shown 16 November 2009)
 Living with Alcohol: a special about children's experiences with alcohol, presented by Barney Harwood.
 "Ricky Investigates": a six-part investigative series which began on 28 September 2010
 A one-off Newsround Investigates documentary on arson in schools was broadcast in May 2006.

The most recent Newsround Specials:

Newsround Showbiz
A light-hearted entertainment news round-up, originally known as Newsround Lite and introduced as part of the CBBC Channel's launch in February 2002. The latter version of the show was hosted by regular Newsround presenters/reporters Lizzie Greenwood-Hughes, Adam Fleming, Rachel Horne and Thalia Pellegrini, and produced by Sinéad Rocks. The programme was axed in 2005.

Sportsround

A Saturday morning sports magazine show introduced in September 2005 and produced by Sinead Rocks. It was cancelled in December 2010 and replaced by Match of the Day Kickabout, which was cancelled in 2021. In 2010 it was presented by Ore Oduba with reporters Des Clarke and Jon Franks.

Newsround Review of the Year
Until 2006, a half-hour review of the year special was produced for broadcast during the Christmas/New Year period. The last review aired in 2009, and from 2010 – 2019 and 2021–present, the final bulletin of the year was hosted by all presenters who discuss their most memorable news stories.

References

External links
 
 
 BBC Editors' blog – Simon Goretzki
 BBC Editors' blog – former editor Sinéad Rocks
 BBC Editors' blog – former editor Tim Levell
 Newsround blog
 Newsround History
 British Film Institute Screen Online
 

CBBC shows
BBC children's television shows
BBC television news shows
British television news shows
1972 British television series debuts
1970s British children's television series
1980s British children's television series
1990s British children's television series
2000s British children's television series
2010s British children's television series
2020s British children's television series
English-language television shows
Children's news shows